Federalist No. 10 is an essay written by James Madison as the tenth of The Federalist Papers, a series of essays initiated by Alexander Hamilton arguing for the ratification of the United States Constitution. Published on November 22, 1787, under the name "Publius", Federalist No. 10 is among the most highly regarded of all American political writings.

No. 10 addresses the question of how to reconcile citizens with interests contrary to the rights of others or inimical to the interests of the community as a whole. Madison saw factions as inevitable due to the nature of man—that is, as long as people hold differing opinions, have differing amounts of wealth and own differing amounts of property, they will continue to form alliances with people who are most similar to them and they will sometimes work against the public interest and infringe upon the rights of others. He thus questions how to guard against those dangers.

Federalist No. 10 continues a theme begun in Federalist No. 9 and is titled "The Utility of the Union as a Safeguard Against Domestic Faction and Insurrection". The whole series is cited by scholars and jurists as an authoritative interpretation and explication of the meaning of the Constitution. Historians such as Charles A. Beard argue that No. 10 shows an explicit rejection by the Founding Fathers of the principles of direct democracy and factionalism, and argue that Madison suggests that a representative republic is more effective against partisanship and factionalism.

Madison saw the federal Constitution as providing for a "happy combination" of a republic and a purer democracy, with "the great and aggregate interests being referred to the national, the local and particular to the State legislatures" resulting in a decentralized governmental structure. In his view, this would make it "more difficult for unworthy candidates to practice the vicious arts by which elections are too often carried."

Background

Prior to the Constitution, the thirteen states were bound together by the Articles of Confederation. These were, in essence, a military alliance between sovereign nations adopted to better fight the Revolutionary War. Congress had no power to tax, and as a result, was not able to pay debts resulting from the Revolution. Madison, George Washington, Benjamin Franklin and others feared a break-up of the union and national bankruptcy. Like Washington, Madison felt the revolution had not resolved the social problems that had triggered it, and the excesses ascribed to the King were now being repeated by the state legislatures. In this view, Shays' Rebellion, an armed uprising in Massachusetts in 1786, was simply one, albeit extreme, example of "democratic excess" in the aftermath of the War.

A national convention was called for May 1787, to revise the Articles of Confederation. Madison believed that the problem was not with the Articles, but rather the state legislatures, and so the solution was not to fix the articles but to restrain the excesses of the states. The principal questions before the convention became whether the states should remain sovereign, whether sovereignty should be transferred to the national government, or whether a settlement should rest somewhere in between. By mid-June, it was clear that the convention was drafting a new plan of government around these issues—a constitution. Madison's nationalist position shifted the debate increasingly away from a position of pure state sovereignty, and toward the compromise. In a debate on June 26, he said that government ought to "protect the minority of the opulent against the majority" and that unchecked, democratic communities were subject to "the turbulency and weakness of unruly passions".

Publication

September 17, 1787 marked the signing of the final document. By its own Article Seven, the constitution drafted by the convention needed ratification by at least nine of the thirteen states, through special conventions held in each state. Anti-Federalist writers began to publish essays and letters arguing against ratification, and Alexander Hamilton recruited James Madison and John Jay to write a series of pro-ratification letters in response.

Like most of the Federalist essays and the vast majority of The Federalist Papers, No. 10 first appeared in popular newspapers. It was first printed in the Daily Advertiser under the name adopted by the Federalist writers, "Publius"; in this it was remarkable among the essays of Publius, as almost all of them first appeared in one of two other papers: the Independent Journal and the New-York Packet. Federalist No. 37, also by Madison, was the only other essay to appear first in the Advertiser.

Considering the importance later ascribed to the essay, it was reprinted only on a limited scale. On November 23, it appeared in the Packet and the next day in the Independent Journal. Outside New York City, it made four appearances in early 1788: January 2 in the Pennsylvania Gazette, January 10 in the Hudson Valley Weekly, January 15 in the Lansingburgh Northern Centinel, and January 17 in the Albany Gazette. Though this number of reprintings was typical for The Federalist essays, many other essays, both Federalist and Anti-Federalist, saw much wider distribution.

On January 1, 1788, the publishing company J. & A. McLean announced that they would publish the first 36 of the essays in a single volume. This volume, titled The Federalist, was released on March 2, 1788. George Hopkins' 1802 edition revealed that Madison, Hamilton, and Jay were the authors of the series, with two later printings dividing the work by author. In 1818, James Gideon published a third edition containing corrections by Madison, who by that time had completed his two terms as President of the United States.

Henry B. Dawson's edition of 1863 sought to collect the original newspaper articles, though he did not always find the first instance. It was much reprinted, albeit without his introduction. Paul Leicester Ford's 1898 edition included a table of contents which summarized the essays, with the summaries again used to preface their respective essays. The first date of publication and the newspaper name were recorded for each essay. Of modern editions, Jacob E. Cooke's 1961 edition is seen as authoritative, and is most used today.

The question of faction
Federalist No. 10 continues the discussion of the question broached in Hamilton's Federalist No. 9. Hamilton there addressed the destructive role of a faction in breaking apart the republic. The question Madison answers, then, is how to eliminate the negative effects of faction. Madison defines a faction as "a number of citizens, whether amounting to a minority or majority of the whole, who are united and actuated by some common impulse of passion, or of interest, adverse to the rights of other citizens, or to the permanent and aggregate interests of the community." He identifies the most serious source of faction to be the diversity of opinion in political life which leads to dispute over fundamental issues such as what regime or religion should be preferred.

Madison argues that "the most common and durable source of factions has been the various and unequal distribution of property." He states, "Those who hold and those who are without property have ever formed distinct interests in society." Providing some examples of the distinct interests, Madison identified a landed interest, a manufacturing interest, a mercantile interest, a moneyed interest, and "many lesser interests". Madison insists that they all belonged to "different classes" that were "actuated by different sentiments and views." Thus, Madison argues, these different classes would be prone to make decisions in their own interest, and not for the public good. A law regarding private debts, for instance, would be "a question to which the creditors are parties on one side, and the debtors on the other." To this question, and to others like it, Madison notes that, though "justice ought to hold the balance between them," the interested parties would reach different conclusions, "neither with a sole regard to justice and the public good." 

Like the anti-Federalists who opposed him, Madison was substantially influenced by the work of Montesquieu, though Madison and Montesquieu disagreed on the question addressed in this essay. He also relied heavily on the philosophers of the Scottish Enlightenment, especially David Hume, whose influence is most clear in Madison's discussion of the types of faction and in his argument for an extended republic.

Madison's arguments
Madison first theorizes that there are two ways to limit the damage caused by faction: either remove the causes of faction or control its effects. He then describes the two methods to remove the causes of faction: first, destroying liberty, which would work because "liberty is to faction what air is to fire", but it is impossible to perform because liberty is essential to political life, just as air is "essential to animal life." After all, Americans fought for it during the American Revolution. 

The second option, creating a society homogeneous in opinions and interests, is impracticable. The diversity of the people's ability is what makes them succeed more or less, and inequality of property is a right that the government should protect. Madison particularly emphasizes that economic stratification prevents everyone from sharing the same opinion. Madison concludes that the damage caused by faction can be limited only by controlling its effects.

He then argues that the only problem comes from majority factions because the principle of popular sovereignty should prevent minority factions from gaining power. Madison offers two ways to check majority factions: prevent the "existence of the same passion or interest in a majority at the same time" or render a majority faction unable to act. Madison concludes that a small democracy cannot avoid the dangers of majority faction because small size means that undesirable passions can very easily spread to a majority of the people, which can then enact its will through the democratic government without difficulty.

Madison states, "The latent causes of faction are thus sown in the nature of man", so the cure is to control their effects. He makes an argument on how this is not possible in a pure democracy but possible in a republic. With pure democracy, he means a system in which every citizen votes directly for laws (direct democracy), and, with republic, he intends a society in which citizens elect a small body of representatives who then vote for laws (representative democracy). He indicates that the voice of the people pronounced by a body of representatives is more conformable to the interest of the community, since, again, common people's decisions are affected by their self-interest.

He then makes an argument in favor of a large republic against a small republic for the choice of "fit characters" to represent the public's voice. In a large republic, where the number of voters and candidates is greater, the probability to elect competent representatives is broader. The voters have a wider option. In a small republic, it would also be easier for the candidates to fool the voters but more difficult in a large one. 

The last argument Madison makes in favor of a large republic is that as, in a small republic, there will be a lower variety of interests and parties, a majority will more frequently be found. The number of participants of that majority will be lower, and, since they live in a more limited territory, it would be easier for them to agree and work together for the accomplishment of their ideas. While in a large republic the variety of interests will be greater so to make it harder to find a majority. Even if there is a majority, it would be harder for them to work together because of the large number of people and the fact they are spread out in a wider territory.

A republic, Madison writes, is different from a democracy because its government is placed in the hands of delegates, and, as a result of this, it can be extended over a larger area. The idea is that, in a large republic, there will be more "fit characters" to choose from for each delegate. Also, the fact that each representative is chosen from a larger constituency should make the "vicious arts" of electioneering (a reference to rhetoric) less effective. For instance, in a large republic, a corrupt delegate would need to bribe many more people in order to win an election than in a small republic. Also, in a republic, the delegates both filter and refine the many demands of the people so as to prevent the type of frivolous claims that impede purely democratic governments.

Though Madison argued for a large and diverse republic, the writers of the Federalist Papers recognized the need for a balance. They wanted a republic diverse enough to prevent faction but with enough commonality to maintain cohesion among the states. In Federalist No. 2, John Jay counted as a blessing that America possessed "one united people—a people descended from the same ancestors, the same language, professing the same religion". Madison himself addresses a limitation of his conclusion that large constituencies will provide better representatives. He notes that if constituencies are too large, the representatives will be "too little acquainted with all their local circumstances and lesser interests". He says that this problem is partly solved by federalism. No matter how large the constituencies of federal representatives, local matters will be looked after by state and local officials with naturally smaller constituencies.

Contemporaneous counterarguments

The Anti-Federalists vigorously contested the notion that a republic of diverse interests could survive. The author "Cato" (another pseudonym, most likely that of George Clinton) summarized the Anti-Federalist position in the article Cato no. 3:
 
Whoever seriously considers the immense extent of territory comprehended within the limits of the United States, with the variety of its climates, productions, and commerce, the difference of extent, and number of inhabitants in all; the dissimilitude of interest, morals, and policies, in almost every one, will receive it as an intuitive truth, that a consolidated republican form of government therein, can never form a perfect union, establish justice, insure domestic tranquility, promote the general welfare, and secure the blessings of liberty to you and your posterity, for to these objects it must be directed: this unkindred legislature therefore, composed of interests opposite and dissimilar in their nature, will in its exercise, emphatically be, like a house divided against itself.

Generally, it was their position that republics about the size of the individual states could survive, but that a republic on the size of the Union would fail. A particular point in support of this was that most of the states were focused on one industry—to generalize, commerce and shipping in the northern states and plantation farming in the southern. The Anti-Federalist belief that the wide disparity in the economic interests of the various states would lead to controversy was perhaps realized in the American Civil War, which some scholars attribute to this disparity. Madison himself, in a letter to Thomas Jefferson, noted that differing economic interests had created dispute, even when the Constitution was being written. At the convention, he particularly identified the distinction between the northern and southern states as a "line of discrimination" that formed "the real difference of interests".

The discussion of the ideal size for the republic was not limited to the options of individual states or encompassing union. In a letter to Richard Price, Benjamin Rush noted that "Some of our enlightened men who begin to despair of a more complete union of the States in Congress have secretly proposed an Eastern, Middle, and Southern Confederacy, to be united by an alliance offensive and defensive".

In making their arguments, the Anti-Federalists appealed to both historical and theoretic evidence. On the theoretical side, they leaned heavily on the work of Charles de Secondat, Baron de Montesquieu. The Anti-Federalists Brutus and Cato both quoted Montesquieu on the issue of the ideal size of a republic, citing his statement in The Spirit of the Laws that:

It is natural to a republic to have only a small territory, otherwise it cannot long subsist. In a large republic there are men of large fortunes, and consequently of less moderation; there are trusts too great to be placed in any single subject; he has interest of his own; he soon begins to think that he may be happy, great and glorious, by oppressing his fellow citizens; and that he may raise himself to grandeur on the ruins of his country. In a large republic, the public good is sacrificed to a thousand views; it is subordinate to exceptions, and depends on accidents. In a small one, the interest of the public is easier perceived, better understood, and more within the reach of every citizen; abuses are of less extent, and of course are less protected.

Greece and Rome were looked to as model republics throughout this debate, and authors on both sides took Roman pseudonyms. Brutus points out that the Greek and Roman states were small, whereas the U.S. is vast. He also points out that the expansion of these republics resulted in a transition from free government to tyranny.

Modern analysis and reaction
In the first century of the American republic, No. 10 was not regarded as among the more important numbers of The Federalist. For example, in Democracy in America, Alexis de Tocqueville refers specifically to more than fifty of the essays, but No. 10 is not among them. Today, however, No. 10 is regarded as a seminal work of American democracy. In "The People's Vote", a popular survey conducted by the National Archives and Records Administration, National History Day, and U.S. News & World Report, No. 10 (along with Federalist No. 51, also by Madison) was chosen as the 20th most influential document in United States history. David Epstein, writing in 1984, described it as among the most highly regarded of all American political writing.

The historian Charles A. Beard identified Federalist No. 10 as one of the most important documents for understanding the Constitution. In his book An Economic Interpretation of the Constitution of the United States (1913), Beard argued that Madison produced a detailed explanation of the economic factors that lay behind the creation of the Constitution. At the outset of his study, Beard writes that Madison provided "a masterly statement of the theory of economic determinism in politics" (Beard 1913, p. 15). Later in his study, Beard repeated his point,  providing more emphasis. "The most philosophical examination of the foundations of political science is made by Madison in the tenth number," Beard writes. "Here he lays down, in no uncertain language, the principle that the first and elemental concern of every government is economic" (Beard 1913, p. 156).

Douglass Adair attributes the increased interest in the tenth number to Beard's book. Adair also contends that Beard's selective focus on the issue of class struggle, and his political progressivism, has colored modern scholarship on the essay. According to Adair, Beard reads No. 10 as evidence for his belief in "the Constitution as an instrument of class exploitation". Adair's own view is that Federalist No. 10 should be read as "eighteenth-century political theory directed to an eighteenth-century problem; and ... one of the great creative achievements of that intellectual movement that later ages have christened 'Jeffersonian democracy.

Garry Wills is a noted critic of Madison's argument in Federalist No. 10. In his book Explaining America, he adopts the position of Robert Dahl in arguing that Madison's framework does not necessarily enhance the protections of minorities or ensure the common good. Instead, Wills claims: "Minorities can make use of dispersed and staggered governmental machinery to clog, delay, slow down, hamper, and obstruct the majority. But these weapons for delay are given to the minority irrespective of its factious or nonfactious character; and they can be used against the majority irrespective of its factious or nonfactious character. What Madison prevents is not faction, but action. What he protects is not the common good but delay as such".

Application
Federalist No. 10 is sometimes cited as showing that the Founding Fathers and the constitutional framers did not intend American politics to be partisan. For instance, U.S. Supreme Court justice John Paul Stevens cites the paper for the statement that "Parties ranked high on the list of evils that the Constitution was designed to check". Justice Byron White cited the essay while discussing a California provision that forbids candidates from running as independents within one year of holding a partisan affiliation, saying, "California apparently believes with the Founding Fathers that splintered parties and unrestrained factionalism may do significant damage to the fabric of government."

Madison's argument that restraining liberty to limit faction is an unacceptable solution has been used by opponents of campaign finance limits. Justice Clarence Thomas, for example, invoked Federalist No. 10 in a dissent against a ruling supporting limits on campaign contributions, writing: "The Framers preferred a political system that harnessed such faction for good, preserving liberty while also ensuring good government. Rather than adopting the repressive 'cure' for faction that the majority today endorses, the Framers armed individual citizens with a remedy."

References

Secondary sources

 Adair, Douglass.  "The Tenth Federalist Revisited" and "'That Politics May Be Reduced to a Science': David Hume, James Madison and the Tenth Federalist". Fame and the Founding Fathers. Indianapolis: Liberty Fund, 1998.  New York: WW Norton & Co, 1974 
 Ball, Terence. The Federalist with Letters of "Brutus". Cambridge University Press: 2003. 
 Beard, Charles A. An Economic Interpretation of the Constitution of the United States. New York: The MacMillan Company, 1913.
 Bernstein, Richard B. Are We to Be a Nation?  Cambridge, MA: Harvard University Press, 1987. 
 Cohler, Anne. Montesquieu's Comparative Politics and the Spirit of American Constitutionalism. Lawrence: University Press of Kansas, 1988. 
 Dawson, Henry B., ed. The Fœderalist: A Collection of Essays, Written in Favor of the New Constitution, As Agreed Upon by the Fœderal Convention, September 17, 1787. New York: Charles Scribner, 1863.
 Epstein, David F. The Political Theory of The Federalist. Chicago: University of Chicago Press, 1984. 
 Furtwangler, Albert. The Authority of Publius: A Reading of the Federalist Papers. Ithaca, New York: Cornell University Press, 1984. 
 Grant DePauw, Linda. The Eleventh Pillar: New York State and the Federal Constitution. Ithaca, New York: Cornell University Press, 1966. 
 
 Kaminski, John P. George Clinton: Yeoman Politician of the New Republic. Madison: State Historical Society of Wisconsin, 1993. 
 
 Morgan, Edmund S. * "Safety in Numbers: Madison, Hume, and the Tenth 'Federalist,'"  Huntington Library Quarterly (1986) 49#2 pp. 95–112 in JSTOR
 Stewart, David O. The Summer of 1787: The Men Who Invented the Constitution. New York: Simon & Schuster, 2007. 
 Wills, Garry. Explaining America: The Federalist. New York: Penguin Books, 1982. 
 Wood, Gordon. The Creation of the American Republic, 1776–1787. Chapel Hill, NC: UNC Press, 1998. 
 Wood, Gordon. The Idea of America: Reflections on the Birth of the United States. New York: Penguin Press, 2011.

Primary sources
 Hamilton, Alexander; Madison, James; and Jay, John. The Federalist. Edited by Jacob E. Cooke. Middletown, Conn.: Wesleyan University Press, 1961.  Wesleyan 1982 edition: 
 Hamilton, Alexander; Madison, James; and Jay, John. The Federalist. Edited by Henry B. Dawson. Morrisania, New York: Charles Scribner, 1863. Accessed January 22, 2011.
 Hamilton, Alexander; Madison, James; and Jay, John. The Federalist. Edited by Paul Leicester Ford. New York: Henry Holt & Co., 1898.
 Kaminski, John P. and Saladino, Gaspare J., ed. The Documentary History of the Ratification of the Constitution. Madison: State Historical Society of Wisconsin, 1981. 
 Storing, Herbert J.; Dry, Murray, ed. The Complete Anti-Federalist. Vols 1–7. Chicago: University of Chicago Press, 1981. 
 Yates, Robert. Notes of the Secret Debate of the Federal Convention of 1787. Washington, D.C.: Templeman, 1886. Accessed January 22, 2011.

External links 

 Text of The Federalist No. 10: congress.gov
 Online text of Brutus, no. 1, University of Chicago
Online text of Cato, no. 3, same source as above

1787 in American law
1787 in the United States
1787 essays
10